Auchterarder was a constituency of the Parliament of Scotland.

History
Auchterarder had been made a royal burgh in 1246, but the only known burgh commissioner was John Graham of Callander, who attended Parliament on 22 August 1584.

References

History of Perth and Kinross
Politics of Perth and Kinross
Constituencies of the Parliament of Scotland (to 1707)
Auchterarder